The Fadil Vokrri Stadium, previously known as Prishtina City Stadium, is a multi-purpose stadium in Prishtina, Kosovo, which is used mostly for football matches and is the home ground of FC Prishtina and Kosovo national football team. The stadium has a capacity of 13,980.

History

The stadium's construction was started in 1951 and since 1953, it has been used by FC Prishtina. On 9 June 2018, the stadium was renamed from Pristina City Stadium to Fadil Vokrri Stadium, following the death of Fadil Vokrri on the same day, who was a football administrator, player and lastly president of Football Federation of Kosovo. The change was announced by Shpend Ahmeti, the Mayor of Pristina.

Notable events

International concerts
On 17 December 2007 the stadium was filled with 25,000 people for first time after the Kosovo War in a concert by American rapper 50 Cent. On 10 July 2010. The American rapper Snoop Dogg performed in the stadium. This was the second international concert that was held in Pristina after that the 50 Cent concert in 2007 and over 10,000 people attended the concert.

On 15 July 2012. The Albanian rapper Unikkatil held a concert which was the biggest Albanian concert ever held and 25,000 spectators attended the concert to see the “King” of Albanian rap.

International matches
On 7 September 2002, it hosted for first time after Kosovo War a friendly match of Kosovo against Albania and finished with a 0–1 win for Albania.

European matches 
The stadium hosted the 2019–20 UEFA Champions League Preliminary Round Tournament.

The clubs involved were:

  Lincoln Red Imps
  FC Santa Coloma
  Tre Penne
  Feronikeli

Inauguration
On 13 August 2018, after renovation was held a 2018 Kosovar Supercup between the winners of the 2017–18 Football Superleague of Kosovo, Drita and 2017–18 Kosovar Cup, Prishtina. Playing for the first time at the recently refurbished Fadil Vokrri Stadium.

References

External links

Fadil Vokrri Stadium at EU-Football.info

Multi-purpose stadiums
Buildings and structures in Pristina
Football venues in Kosovo
Football venues in Yugoslavia
Athletics (track and field) venues in Kosovo
Athletics (track and field) venues in Yugoslavia
Stadium